Sumangali  is a 1940 Telugu-language film written, directed and produced by B. N. Reddy. The film stars V. Nagayya, A. S. Giri, Kumari and Malathi. The main concept of the film widow remarriage is inspired by Kandukuri Veeresalingam.

Plot 
Satyam is a progressive man. He is loved by his cousin Parvati and Saraswathi. Saraswati, is an advanced thinking, rich woman, learns that she has been married and widowed as a child. Parvathi is an orthodox woman sacrifices her life. Sathyam and Saraswathi marry at the end supporting the film theme of widow marriages.

Credits

Cast 
 V. Nagayya as Panthulu
 A. S. Giri as  Sathyam
 Kumari as Saraswathi
 Malathi as  Parvati
 Mudigonda Lingamurthy
 Seshamamba
 Doraiswamy

Crew 
 Director: B. N. Reddy
 Assistant Director: Kamalakara Kameswara Rao
 Story: K. Ramnoth
 Dialogues: Samudrala Sr.
 Producers: Moola Narayana Swamy and B. N. Reddy
 Production Company: Vauhini Studios
 Original Music: V. Nagayya
 Sound: A. Krishnan
 Cinematography: K. Ramnoth
 Production Designer: A. K. Sekhar
 Production Manager: K. V. Reddy
 Playback singers: V. Nagayya

Songs 
 "Aada Brathuke Madhuram"
 "Baala Pasupu Kumkuma Neeku"
 "Padave Koyila, Padake Koyila"
 "Kaatama Raayuda Kadiri Narasimhuda"  (Lyrics: Samudrala Sr.; Music: V. Nagayya; Singers: Malathi and A. S. Rao)

Reception 
Although a commercial failure, Sumangali is considered a "classic" by critics.

References

External links 
 

1940 films
1940s Telugu-language films
Indian black-and-white films
Films directed by B. N. Reddy
Films scored by Nagayya